Poverty Ridge is an unincorporated community in Fulton County, Illinois, United States, about eleven miles northwest of Lewistown.  Its elevation is 633 feet (202 m), and it is located at  (40.4619856, -90.3409579).  The community is named for a line of hills near Seville, which likewise is named Poverty Ridge.

References

Unincorporated communities in Fulton County, Illinois
Unincorporated communities in Illinois